Halmstad Golf Club (Halmstad Golfklubb; Halmstad GK) is a golf club located in Tylösand, Halmstad Municipality in Sweden. It has hosted the 2007 Solheim Cup and the Chrysler Open on the Ladies European Tour and most recently Scandinavian Mixed.

History
The club was formed in 1930 and the first 18-hole course was approved by the Swedish Golf Federation in 1938, and it hosted its first Swedish Matchplay Championship already in 1939. In 1967, 9 new holes were constructed, which together with the last 9 holes of the old course formed the new North Course. In 1975 the final 9 holes were built, forming the South Course together with the original first 9 holes.

Claiming a home among the towering pines and seaside lands of Sweden's golfing playground, the championship North Course is repeatedly ranked as one of the best golf courses in the country. The British journal Golf World has named the course the best in Sweden and the second best course in Europe outside of the United Kingdom.

The club hosted the 2007 Solheim Cup where the American team led by Betsy King prevailed over the Europeans led by Helen Alfredsson, with Morgan Pressel 2 & 1 against Annika Sörenstam on the final day. Laura Davies won the Chrysler Open here on the 1999 Ladies European Tour and in 1988 Vijay Singh won the Swedish PGA Championship by one stroke over Jesper Parnevik.

The club has also hosted many amateur tournaments such as the 1997 Vagliano Trophy and the 2011 European Amateur, or the St Andrews Trophy where Gaëtan Mourgue D'Algue and Michael Bonallack battled it out here in 1962. It saw Scotland win the European Amateur Team Championship in 1985 with Colin Montgomerie in the team.

Tournaments hosted

Ladies European Tour
Chrysler Open – 19992000

Challenge Tour
Skandia PGA Open – 2002

Amateur 
Swedish Matchplay Championship – 1939194219451973
St Andrews Trophy – 19621986 
European Amateur Team Championship – 19852015
Vagliano Trophy – 1997 
European Amateur – 2011 
Annika Invitational Europe – 2017
Scandinavian Mixed - 2022

Other 
Shell's Wonderful World of Golf – 1963 
Swedish PGA Championship – 198219881989199019911992
Solheim Cup – 2007

See also
List of golf courses in Sweden

References

External links
 

Golf clubs and courses in Sweden
Sport in Halmstad
Solheim Cup venues